Cheng Wen-tsan (born 6 July 1967) is a Taiwanese politician. He is the current Vice Premier of Taiwan. He was the first Mayor of the newly established Taoyuan City, serving from 25 December 2014 to 25 December 2022.

Education
Cheng received his bachelor's degree from the Department of Sociology and master's degree from the Graduate Institute of National Development of National Taiwan University.

Early political career
Cheng played a key role in the Wild Lily student movement.

In the early 2000s Cheng worked for the Democratic Progressive Party's Information and Culture Department. From January 2006, he served as minister of the Government Information Office as part of the first cabinet led by Su Tseng-chang. Cheng resigned from the GIO in April 2007, after vice premier Tsai Ing-wen concluded an investigation into Cheng's influence during a sale of shares in a media company.

2009 Taoyuan County Magistrate election
Cheng joined the 2009 Taoyuan County magistrate election under the Democratic Progressive Party banner on 5 December 2009. However, he lost to Kuomintang opponent John Wu.

Mayor of Taoyuan City
Cheng was elected as the Mayor of Taoyuan City after winning the 2014 Taoyuan City mayoralty election held on 29 November 2014, defeating incumbent Magistrate John Wu of the Kuomintang.

Cheng appointed Chiu Tai-san and Wang Ming-teh as deputy mayors of Taoyuan.

In April 2017, Cheng's rib was fractured after he was attacked by protesters outside Legislative Yuan who were opposing the government plan to pass a bill on pension system reform. However, he did not press charges against the perpetrator because his belief in democratic politics.

2018 Taoyuan City mayor election
Cheng defeated Apollo Chen of the Kuomintang and three independent candidates to win a second term as mayor of Taoyuan on 24 November 2018.

Later political career
Cheng was elected to chair the Chinese Taipei Football Association in October 2022, following the resignation of Chiou I-jen in August of that year.

References

External links

 

1967 births
Living people
Mayors of Taoyuan City
Democratic Progressive Party (Taiwan) politicians
Government ministers of Taiwan
National Taiwan University alumni